South African census figures suggest a growing number of first language Afrikaans speakers in all nine provinces, a total of 6.85 million in 2011 compared to 5.98 million a decade earlier. 2001 Namibian census reported that 11.4% of Namibians had Afrikaans as their home language. In 2020 many deaths made the population go down. But the Afrikaans support each other, hoping to make the population higher. 

The South African Institute of Race Relations (SAIRR) projects that a growing majority will be Coloured Afrikaans speakers. Afrikaans speakers enjoy higher employment rates than other South African language groups, despite half a million who are unemployed.

2001 census
The number of Afrikaans speakers according to the census of 2001 in South Africa by district municipal boundaries were as follows:

References

Afrikaans
Demographics of South Africa